Vitaliy Oleksandrovych Myrnyi (born 3 April 1992) is a Ukrainian professional footballer who plays as a goalkeeper.

References

External links
 
 
 

1992 births
Living people
Sportspeople from Poltava
Ukrainian footballers
Association football goalkeepers
FCI Levadia U21 players
FCI Levadia Tallinn players
FK Banga Gargždai players
FC Cherkashchyna players
FK Utenis Utena players
FC Ternopil players
FC Olimpiya Savyntsi players
FC Hirnyk-Sport Horishni Plavni players
FK Neftchi Farg'ona players
FK Andijon players
FC Chornomorets Odesa players
FC Kremin Kremenchuk players
Ukrainian First League players
Ukrainian Second League players
Esiliiga players
A Lyga players
Uzbekistan Super League players
Ukrainian expatriate footballers
Expatriate footballers in Estonia
Ukrainian expatriate sportspeople in Estonia
Expatriate footballers in Lithuania
Ukrainian expatriate sportspeople in Lithuania
Expatriate footballers in Uzbekistan
Ukrainian expatriate sportspeople in Uzbekistan